Notburga (c. 1265 – 13 September 1313), also known as Notburga of Rattenberg or Notburga of Eben, was an Austrian saint and peasant from Tyrol, Numerous vitae have been written about her and painted by her where she is depicted with a scythe, She is venerated by the Catholic Church, having been canonized by Pope Pius IX.

Life
Notburga was born about 1265 at Rattenberg on the Inn river. She was a cook in the household of Count Henry of Rattenberg, and used to give food to the poor. But Ottilia, her mistress, ordered her to feed any leftover food to the pigs. To continue her mission, Notburga began to save some of her own food, especially on Fridays, and took it to the poor.

According to her legend, one day her master met her and commanded her to show him what she was carrying. She obeyed but instead of the food he saw only shavings, and instead of wine, vinegar. As a result of Notburga's actions, Ottilia dismissed her, but soon fell dangerously ill. Notburga remained to nurse her and prepared her for death.

Next, Notburga worked for a peasant in Eben am Achensee, on the condition that she be permitted to go to church evenings before Sundays and festivals. One evening her master urged her to continue working in the field. Throwing her sickle into the air she supposedly said: "Let my sickle be judge between me and you," and the sickle remained suspended in the air.

In the meantime, Count Henry had suffered difficulties, which he ascribed to his dismissal of Notburga, so he rehired her and the estate prospered.  Shortly before her death she is said to have told her master to place her corpse on a wagon drawn by two oxen and to bury her wherever the oxen stood still. The oxen drew the wagon to the chapel of St. Rupert near Eben, where she was buried.

Veneration
On 27 March 1862, Pope Pius IX canonized Notburga as a saint. Her feast is celebrated on 13 September. She is usually represented with an ear of corn, or flowers and a sickle in her hand; sometimes the sickle is suspended in the air.

References

External links

1265 births
1313 deaths
Austrian Roman Catholic saints
German Roman Catholic saints
History of Tyrol (region)
13th-century Christian saints
14th-century Christian saints
Christian female saints of the Middle Ages
13th-century people of the Holy Roman Empire
13th-century women of the Holy Roman Empire
14th-century people of the Holy Roman Empire
14th-century women of the Holy Roman Empire
Medieval Austrian saints
Medieval German saints
Female saints of medieval Germany